Sir Sidney Frederic Harmer, KBE, FRS (9 March 1862 – 22 October 1950) was a British zoologist.  He was President of the Linnean Society 1927–1931 and was awarded the Linnean Medal in 1934.

Sidney Harmer was Superintendent of the Cambridge University Museum of Zoology from 1892–1908, Keeper of Zoology at the Natural History Museum from 1909 to 1921 and director of the Museum from 1919 to 1927. His research library is held in the National Marine Biological Library at the Marine Biological Association in Plymouth.

He was made KBE in the 1920 civilian war honours.

He was the father of Russell Harmer, the gold-medal winning British sailor, and great uncle of the actress and writer Juliet Harmer, best known for her role in the 1960s TV series Adam Adamant Lives!.

Selected publications

as editor with Sir Arthur Shipley: 

with Richard Lydekker:

References

External links

1862 births
1950 deaths
British zoologists
Directors of the Natural History Museum, London
Fellows of the Royal Society
Presidents of the Linnean Society of London
Members of the Royal Swedish Academy of Sciences
Knights Commander of the Order of the British Empire